Eo Jae-sik (born 30 May 1948) is a South Korean alpine skier. He competed in two events at the 1968 Winter Olympics.

References

1948 births
Living people
South Korean male alpine skiers
Olympic alpine skiers of South Korea
Alpine skiers at the 1968 Winter Olympics
20th-century South Korean people